In aviation, a control zone (CTR) is a volume of controlled airspace, usually situated below a control area, normally around an airport, which extends from the surface to a specified upper limit, established to protect air traffic operating to and from that airport. Because CTRs are, by definition, controlled airspace, aircraft can only fly in it after receiving a specific clearance from air traffic control. This means that air traffic control at the airport know exactly which aircraft are in that airspace, and can take steps to ensure aircraft are aware of each other, either using separation or by passing traffic information.

In the USA the term control zone is no longer used and has been replaced by airspace class D. Typically it extends 5 miles in diameter with a height of 2500 ft AGL (above ground level) around small commercial airports. Aircraft are required to establish radio contact with the control tower before entering and to maintain in contact while in class D airspace. This implies that an aircraft must be equipped with at least a portable radio to fly in Class D airspace.

In the UK, control zones are normally class D airspace and usually extend from the surface to 2000 ft AGL. They can be observed to be usually rectangular, extending along the axis of the main runway, although irregular shapes may be used where more complex airspace dictates this (see Liverpool and East Midlands). A control area (CTA) is often placed between a CTR and nearby airways to give uninterrupted controlled airspace to airways arrivals and departures.

In Germany, control zones are a special type of class D airspace, called D (CTR). The main difference to the regular German class D airspace is, that within a CTR there is a minimum required cloud ceiling of 1500 ft AGL.

See also
Airway (aviation)
Flight information region
Terminal control area
Area control center (for high-altitude traffic between airports)

References 

Air traffic control